Jennifer (Jen) Dionne is an American scientist and pioneer of nanophotonics. She is currently Senior Associate Vice Provost of Research Platforms at Stanford University, a Chan Zuckerberg Biohub Investigator, and an Associate Professor of Materials Science and Engineering and by courtesy, of Radiology. She serves as Director of the Department of Energy's "Photonics at Thermodynamic Limits" Energy Frontier Research Center (EFRC), which strives to create thermodynamic engines driven by light, and she leads the "Extreme Scale Characterization" efforts of the DOE's Q-NEXT Quantum Science Center. She is also an Associate Editor of the ACS journal Nano Letters.  Jen's research develops optical methods to observe and control chemical and biological processes as they unfold with nanometer scale resolution, emphasizing critical challenges in global health and sustainability.

Early life and education 

Dionne was born October 28, 1981, in Warwick, Rhode Island to Sandra Dionne (Draper), an intensive care unit nurse, and George Dionne, a cabinet maker. She grew up figure skating, but also enjoyed science and math. As a student at Bay View Academy, she was selected to be a Student Ambassador to Australia. She also participated in the Washington University Summer Scholars Program and the Harvard University Secondary School Program.

She attended Washington University in St. Louis, where she received bachelor's degrees in Physics and Systems Science and Mathematics in 2003. There, she served on the Mission Control of Steve Fosset's first attempted solo hot air balloon circumnavigation. She also worked as student lead of the Crow Observatory.

She then received her  and doctoral degrees in Applied Physics from Caltech in 2009, advised by Harry Atwater. At Caltech, she was named an Everhart Lecturer, and awarded the Francis and Milton Clauser Prize for Best Ph.D. Thesis, recognizing her work developing the first negative refractive index material at visible wavelengths and nanoscale Si-based photonic modulators. Before starting her faculty position at Stanford, she spent a year as a postdoctoral fellow in Chemistry at Berkeley and Lawrence Berkeley National Lab, advised by Paul Alivisatos.

Career 
Dionne began as an assistant professor at Stanford in March, 2010. In 2016, she was promoted to Associate Professor, and became an affiliate faculty of the Wu Tsai Neuroscience Institute, Bio-X, and the Precourt Institute for Energy. In 2019, she joined the Department of Radiology as a courtesy faculty. In 2019-2021, she was Director of the TomKat Center for Sustainable Energy, and initiated their graduate student fellowship. In 2020, she became a Senior Fellow of the Precourt Institute and was appointed Senior Associate Vice Provost for Research Platforms. In her Vice Provost role, she is helping Stanford to redefine shared research facilities across the Schools of Engineering, Medicine, Humanities and Sciences, Earth Sciences, and SLAC. She initiated the Community for Shared Research Platforms (c-ShaRP), which has enabled improved education, instrumentation, organization, staffing, and translational efforts in the shared facilities.

In her research, Dionne is a pioneer in manipulating light at the atomic and molecular scale. Under Dionne's leadership, her lab helped to establish the field of quantum plasmonics. She also made critical contributions to the field of plasmon photocatalysis, including developing combined optical and environmental electron microscopy to image chemical transformations with near-atomic-scale resolution. Her work in plasmon catalysis could enable sustainable materials manufacturing, overturning the traditional trade-offs in thermal catalysis between selectivity and activity. Her group is also credited with developing the first high-quality-factor phase-gradient metasurfaces for resonant beam-shaping and beam-steering. Dionne uses this platform to detect pathogens, and view  the intricacies of molecular-to-cellular structure, binding, and dynamics.

Awards 

 In 2011, MIT Technology Review Top Innovator under 35 
 In 2012, Washington University in St. Louis Outstanding Young Alum Award 
 In 2013, Oprah's 50 Things That Will Make You Say "Wow!" 
 In 2014, the Presidential Early Career Award for Scientists and Engineers given by President Barack Obama 
 In 2015, the Sloan Research Fellowship
In 2015, the Dreyfus Teacher-Scholar Award 
 In 2016, the Adolph Lomb Medal from Optica/the Optical Society of America 
 In 2017, the Moore Inventor's Fellowship 
 In 2019, the NIH Director's New Innovator Award
 In 2019, the Alan T. Waterman Award for top US Scientist under 40, National Science Foundation
In 2021, a Fellow of The Optical Society

Patents 
Patents include:

 Metal Oxide Si field effect plasmonic modulator
 Quantum converting nanoparticles as electrical field sensors
 Method and structure for plasmonic optical trapping of nanoscale particles
 Slot waveguide for color display
 Direct detection of nucleic acids and proteins
 Multiplexed nanophotonic microarray biosensor
 A method for compact and low-cost vibrational spectroscopy platforms

References 

Washington University physicists
Washington University in St. Louis alumni
California Institute of Technology alumni
Stanford University faculty
American women physicists
Year of birth missing (living people)
Living people
21st-century American women scientists
Women in optics
Optical engineers
Optical physicists
American women engineers
American materials scientists
21st-century American engineers
21st-century American physicists
Metamaterials scientists
American nanotechnologists